Shirley Peterson may refer to:
 Shirley Hardman (born 1928), New Zealand athlete, married name Shirley Peterson
Shirley D. Peterson, American lawyer